A hunting knife is a knife used during hunting for preparing the game to be used as food: skinning the animal and cutting up the meat.  It is different from the hunting dagger which was traditionally used to kill wild game.

Some hunting knives are adapted for other uses in the wild; such as a camp knife, which hunters may use  as machetes or hatchets when those specific tools are not available. In this case, their function is similar to a survival knife.

Design

Hunting knives are traditionally designed for cutting rather than stabbing, and usually have a single sharpened edge. The blade is slightly curved on most models, and some hunting knives may have a blade that has both a curved portion for skinning, and a straight portion for cutting slices of meat. Some blades incorporate a guthook.  Most hunting knives designed as "skinners" have a rounded point as to not damage the skin as it is being removed.

Types of knife 
 Fixed-Blade- Fixed-blade versus a folding knife is both personal and practical. If the game you hunt is large and the terrain more rugged, a fixed blade knife is often a better option for its strength and dependability.
 Folding knives- Folding knives have the advantage of being easier to carry and to conceal. They are also considered safer. They can be kept in pocket easily.
 Out Of the Front Knives- OTF knives usually used by Military personnel.

Type of blade 

 Clip Point - The clip point knife blade is thin with a well-defined point. The blade itself is relatively flat. And this type of blade is used for the Dressing and Skinning.
 Drop Point- The blade of a drop point knife is thick and curved. It’s used to dress the animal and skinning.
 Skinning Blade- These types of blade specially designed for skinning. The blade quickly and neatly separates the skin from the meat.

Examples
Hunting knives include the puukko, the Yakutian knife, and the Sharpfinger. Most American designs are based on a smaller version of the Bowie knife. Knifemaker Bob Loveless popularized the drop point hunting knife and William Scagel popularized the Camp knife.

See also 
 Yakutian knife

References

Knives
Hunting equipment
Fur trade